"To & Fro" is a single from Mattafix's debut album, Signs of a Struggle, released in 2005. The song features backing vocals from former Sugababes member, Siobhán Donaghy. It was released as a download only single on 13 March 2006 in the United Kingdom.

Track listing

Digital download
"To & Fro" (Winning Remix)
"To & Fro" (featuring Disiz La Peste)

CD single
"To & Fro"
"11.30" (Sweetie Irie Remix) (featuring Babychan)

EP
"To & Fro"
"To & Fro" (Desert Eagle Discs Remix)
"To & Fro" (Chicken Lips Remix)

Charts

References

2006 singles
2006 songs
Virgin Records singles
Songs written by Marlon Roudette
Mattafix songs